Gradenšak is a small settlement in the Municipality of Lenart in northeastern Slovenia. It lies in the Slovene Hills. The area is part of the traditional region of Styria and is now included in the Drava Statistical Region.

References

External links
Gradenšak on Geopedia

Populated places in the Municipality of Lenart